Esther Welmoet Dijserinck (Den Helder, February 7, 1876 - The Hague, November 11, 1956), known under the penname Welmoet Wijnaendts Francken-Dyserinck, was a Dutch journalist and feminist, cofounder of Dutch Girl Guiding and the World Association of Girl Guides and Girl Scouts (WAGGGS).

1876 births
1956 deaths
Dutch feminists
Dutch journalists
People from Den Helder
Scouting and Guiding in the Netherlands
Scouting pioneers